John Houlihan may refer to:
 John C. Houlihan (1910–1986), mayor of Oakland, California
 John J. Houlihan (1923–2003), American politician and businessman in Illinois